David Nnaji (born July 1985) is a Nigerian actor, notable for his role as Ifeanyi in the television series Dear Mother.

Biography
Nnaji was born in July 1985 in Lagos State, Nigeria and had all his schooling in the state. Nnaji is the fourth of five children and has two children, Chinualumogu Naetochukwu Nnaji and Adaezeh Munachimso Nnaji. He went on to bag a bachelor's degree in History and Strategic Studies from the University of Lagos.

Upon graduation from the university, Nnaji founded a record label called DUN Entertainment Limited. He interpreted the role of Ifeanyi in the series Dear Mother which was shown on television for over a decade.

See also
 List of Nigerian film producers

References 

21st-century Nigerian male actors
Male actors from Lagos State
University of Lagos alumni
Living people
1985 births
Nigerian male television actors
Igbo male actors